Let There Be Light: Modern Cosmology and Kabbalah, a New Conversation Between Science and Religion is a book by Howard Smith, an astrophysicist. The book, published in 2006, was written for the layperson. It discusses using simple language basic concepts in modern cosmology and Kabbalah (a form of Jewish mysticism), the creation of the universe from nothing via the Big Bang, general relativity, dark matter, cosmic acceleration, quantum mechanics, and free will, among other topics. The book attempts to clearly explains these subjects, and uses them to try to illustrate how religion and science together can enrich one's spiritual and intellectual life.

Bibliography

References

External links
Book website

2006 non-fiction books
Occult books
Religious studies books
Kabbalah
2006 in religion